Messi is a 2017 Bengali football film directed by Riingo Banerjee and produced by Pradip Churiwal. The title is a reference to Argentine footballer Lionel Messi.

Plot 
Messi is a story about two brothers. The elder brother Prosun doesn't do anything except loitering around with his girlfriend and fixing local football matches for his brother from whom he gets a share of winning money. The younger brother Chotu, who wears the jersey titled "Messi", is highly gifted in football (soccer) skills. He is the pride of his family and the hope of their father who once used to be a football coach. While attending one such match which Prosun arranges for Chotu, an accident happens and Chotu is left physically disadvantaged for life. The unfortunate incident fills Prosun with unfathomed guilt, and to get rid of this guilt he attempts to achieve the impossible. He attempts to step into his brother's shoes.

Cast 
 Aryann Bhowmik as Chotu
 Shankar Chakraborty
 Chaiti Ghoshal as Malati
 Nigel Anthony
Ronodeep Bose as Prasun
 Arindam Bose
 Rana Mitra
 Ashika
 Sumit samadder

References

External links
 

2017 films
Bengali-language Indian films
2010s Bengali-language films
Lionel Messi
Indian association football films
Films directed by Riingo Banerjee